Industrias Bachoco, S.A. de C.V. or Bachoco is a poultry producer in Mexico.  Its primary operations include preparing feed, breeding and growing chickens, and processing and distributing chicken products. It also grows swine.

In 4Q16, the Company reported net financial income of $313.5 million (pesos) 

Bachoco expanded into the US by acquiring Arkansas poultry company, OK Foods, Inc.

From a press release, as of January 2017: 

Industrias Bachoco is the leader in the Mexican poultry industry, and one of the largest poultry producers globally. The Company was founded in 1952, and became a public company in 1997, via a public offering of shares on the Mexican and The New York Stock Exchange. Bachoco is a vertically integrated company headquartered in Celaya, Guanajuato located in Central Mexico. Its main business lines are: chicken, eggs, balanced feed, swine, and turkey and beef value-added products. Bachoco owns and manages more than a thousand facilities, organized in nine production complexes and 64 distribution centers in Mexico, and a production complex in the United States. Currently the Company employs more than 25,000 people.

The Company is rated AAA (MEX), the highest rating awarded by Fitch Mexico, S.A. de C.V., and HR AAA which signals that the Company and the offering both have the highest credit quality by HR Ratings de Mexico S.A. de C.V.

Industrias Bachoco’s shares are listed on the Mexican Stock Exchange and its American
Depositary Shares (ADSs) are listed on the New York Stock Exchange. One ADS
represents 12 B shares.

References

External links
 
 Official website
 OK Foods
 Yahoo profile

Companies listed on the New York Stock Exchange
Food and drink companies of Mexico